The Taipei Hospital is a public hospital in Xinzhuang District, New Taipei, Taiwan.

History
The hospital was established in 1972. On 13 August 2018, a fire broke out at the senior care center on the seventh floor of the hospital which caused 9 fatalities and 30 injuries. The cause of the fire was found out to be a short circuit on hospital bed 235 inside ward 7A23.

Transportation
The hospital is accessible within walking distance north of Touqianzhuang Station of Taipei Metro.

See also
 List of hospitals in Taiwan

References

1972 establishments in Taiwan
Hospitals established in 1972
Hospitals in New Taipei